Gareth Sprake (3 April 1945 – 18 October 2016) was a Welsh professional footballer. A goalkeeper, he played for Leeds United and Birmingham City and also won 37 caps for Wales.

Sprake became known during his career as a brilliant goalkeeper who was prone to occasional mistakes. He was especially known for his ability to come out to catch crossed balls floating into the box and his shot stopping. At Leeds, Sprake played 504 times, keeping more than 200 clean sheets. He spent more than a decade as the number 1 keeper at Leeds during a period when they were a dominant side in the English domestic game.

Club career
Sprake represented Swansea Schoolboys and was noticed by Leeds United soon after he left school and was playing for a local works team.

Sprake joined Leeds as an apprentice, and made a last-minute debut in 1962 when the regular goalkeeper went down with a stomach complaint on the day of a game at Southampton. Over the next two seasons Sprake became a regular as Leeds won the Second Division in 1964, and then challenged for the Football League championship title and FA Cup double the following year. Sprake only missed one game in both competitions that season, but Leeds ended with nothing, missing out on the League title on goal average to Manchester United and losing the FA Cup final to Liverpool. At Leeds, he was also known to be sick before each match but managed to play regularly and keep the starting goalkeeper position.

The first of Sprake's two notorious errors came in 1967 when Leeds played Liverpool in a League game at Anfield. Sprake was holding the ball and was set to throw it to the Leeds left back Terry Cooper, only to curtail his throw when he spotted Liverpool winger Ian Callaghan running towards the area he planned to throw the ball. Unfortunately for Sprake, the ball slipped out of his hands behind him and ended up in the net. At half-time, the Liverpool tannoy-announcer played "Careless Hands", a record by Des O'Connor, apparently in reference to Sprake's mistake, and during the second half Liverpool supporters on the Kop sang the song repeatedly to Sprake. During his time at Leeds, fans of rival clubs gave Sprake the nickname "Careless Hands" as a result.

In the same season Sprake kept a clean sheet as Leeds beat Arsenal in the League Cup final, and he performed heroics behind an overworked defence as Leeds won the Fairs Cup, the club's first European honour. In 1969, Sprake was again a regular as Leeds won the League championship.

In 1970, Sprake and Leeds chased a treble of the League, the FA Cup and the European Cup, but ended up with nothing. The League title went to Everton who won by nine points, and Leeds went out of the European Cup in the semi-finals to Celtic. The FA Cup Final provided the stage for the second of Sprake's most memorable errors.

In the 1970 FA Cup Final, Leeds were playing Chelsea and took an early lead through Jack Charlton. Chelsea chased an equaliser, but when attacking midfield player Peter Houseman hit a left foot shot shortly before the break, it seemed tame and directionless enough for Sprake to save it safely. Sprake dived full length to save it but it squirmed through his grasp and rolled into the net. At the time, the Wembley surface was in poor condition, with the stadium having hosted the Horse of the Year Show days earlier and having much of the grass turned into hard turf lumps as a result, as well as the presence of a vast covering of sand.

In the second half, Mick Jones put Leeds ahead with just six minutes to go, but Chelsea again equalized. Sprake suffered a knee injury and was replaced by David Harvey in the replay, which Chelsea won 2–1.

Sprake was still the first-choice keeper for Leeds in the following two seasons, but was replaced by Harvey at the tail of both, including the 1972 FA Cup Final. Sprake watched from the sidelines as Leeds defeated Arsenal 1–0 in 1972 with a goal from Allan Clarke and a superb performance by Harvey at the other end. In the same year, due to his need of first-team football, Sprake publicly criticised Revie for his treatment of him and so his relationship with his manager, teammates, and the Leeds supporters soured. He only played once in the 1972–73 season, missed two more Cup finals, and eventually left for Birmingham City for £100,000 (breaking the world record transfer fee for a goalkeeper in the process) to play first-team football and regain his place in the Welsh team.

International career

Sprake was the youngest-ever goalkeeper to appear for Wales when he made his international debut as an 18-year-old against Scotland on 20 November 1963.

Sprake won 37 caps for Wales between 1963 and 1974.

After football

A back injury brought Sprake's career to an end at the age of 30, the injury resulting from a near fatal blood clot in his back which forced him to undergo spinal fusion surgery. His severe back problems have been largely blamed on regular injections of cortisone he was given during his early career at Leeds. After retiring, Sprake underwent seven operations on his back. He subsequently kept his profile low, returning to his native Wales. He was paid £7,500 by the Daily Mirror to make allegations against former Leeds manager Don Revie and club captain regarding match-fixing, but refused to repeat the allegations under oath in court. Wolverhampton Wanderers' Derek Dougan asserted that he heard no mention of the bribes.

Following his retirement, Sprake worked as a salesman for a short period before becoming a borough council training officer in Solihull, a job which he remained in for over 14 years. His biography, Careless Hands: The Forgotten Truth of Gary Sprake by Tim Johnson and Stuart Sprake (his nephew), was published in 2006. In November 2009 Sprake was given an award by the Football Association of Wales for his contribution to Welsh football during the 1960s and 1970s. Sprake died at the age of 71 on 18 October 2016.

Honours
Leeds United

 Football League Second Division: 1963–64
 Football League First Division: 1968–69
 Football League Cup: 1968
 Inter-Cities Fairs Cup: 1968, 1971
 FA Charity Shield: 1969

References

External links
 

1945 births
2016 deaths
Welsh footballers
Wales international footballers
Wales under-23 international footballers
Footballers from Swansea
Leeds United F.C. players
Birmingham City F.C. players
Association football goalkeepers
English Football League players
FA Cup Final players